is a Japanese actor. Watanabe has been hosting a report-type programme "Watanabe Atsushi no Tatemono Tanbō" on TV Asahi since 1989.

Selected filmography

Films
Saigono Tokotai (1970)
New Abashiri Prison (1970)
Bakumatsu (1973)
The Burmese Harp (1985)
The Million Ryo Pot (2004)

Television Drama
The Water Margin (1973),
Shinsho Taikōki (1973),
Unmeitōge (1974)
Hissatsu Shiokiya Kagyō (1975)
Hissatsu Shiwazanin (1976)
Oretachi wa Tenshi da! (1979) 
Shin Edo no Kaze (1980)
Edo no Asayake (1980) 
Tokugawa Ieyasu (Taiga drama)  (1983)
Hissatsu Watashinin (1984)
Tokusō Saizensen (1985-87)
The Unfettered Shogun4  (1991–92)

Other Television appearances
 Watanabe Atsushi no Tatemono Tanbō (1989 – present)

References

External links
 

Japanese male actors
1947 births
Living people